Infinite Armies is a customizable card game for two players.  It was created by Greg Porter, and published in 2005 by Blacksburg Tactical Research Center.  It follows on the success of the collectible card game genre, but establishes its own niche by allowing players to fully design, customize, and print their own cards. Whether this is a viable business concept is still being tested, as most card games rely heavily on sales of cards and the continued publication of new cards.

The heart of the game is a PDF file called iArmy Builder, which uses the functions of the Adobe Acrobat program to allow players to create and print their own cards using any graphics files they like.  The first versions focused on traditional modern armies, with tanks, infantry, airpower, etc.  But in theory, a player may base their cards on any idea they like, such as spacecraft, fantasy, cartoon characters, or even photos of friends and family.

Reception
The game won the 2005 Origins Vanguard Award for new gaming concept. It is the first PDF-only game to win an Origins award.

References

External links
Infinite Armies at Blacksburg Tactical Research Center website
Review by Steve Jackson Games

Blacksburg Tactical Research Center games
Card games introduced in 2005
Dedicated deck card games
Origins Award winners